Sigurd Hille (born 6 May 1950) is a Norwegian politician for the Conservative Party. He was elected to the Parliament of Norway from Hordaland in 2013 where he was a member of the Standing Committee on Finance and Economic Affairs until 2017.

References 

Conservative Party (Norway) politicians
Members of the Storting
Hordaland politicians
1950 births
Living people
21st-century Norwegian politicians